Four referendums were held in Switzerland during 1957. The first two were held on 3 March on a federal resolutions on introducing two new articles to the federal constitution; 22bis concerning civil protection and 36bis on radio and television. Both were rejected. The third and fourth were held on 24 November on introducing another article to the constitution (24 quinquies concerning nuclear power and protection from radiation) and a federal resolution on prolonging the federal breadstuffs law. Both were approved.

Results

March: Constitutional amendment on civil protection

March: Constitutional amendment on radio and television

November: Constitutional amendment on nuclear power

November: Prolonging the federal breadstuffs law

References

Switzerland
Referendums
1957